Kylie Nolan (born 27 June 1998) is a Welsh professional footballer who plays as a midfielder for Cheltenham Town of the FA Women's National League South.

Nolan was born in Wales and played youth football with Cardiff City Ladies before starting her professional career with Bristol City W.F.C.

Nolan has won 6 caps for the Wales national team, scoring 1 goal.

Early life 
Nolan was born in Wales.

Club career 
Nolan was at Cardiff as a young player but failed to make a single appearance. On 5 January 2018, Nolan joined Bristol City but has not made an appearance yet.

International career 
Nolan made her international debut against Norway on 7 June 2016 in the UEFA Women's Championship. Nolan then did not get called up till 2018 where she played against Bosnia and Herzegovina, Russia and England in the World Cup qualification games. So far, She has made 5 caps for Wales

Club statistics

Club

International

References 

Living people
1998 births
Welsh women's footballers
Bristol City W.F.C. players
Women's association football midfielders